Rock and Roll Night Club is Canadian recording artist Mac DeMarco's debut mini-LP. It was recorded in 2012 in DeMarco's Montreal-based studio Jizz Jazz Studios and released through Captured Tracks on March 13, 2012.

Composition
Rock and Roll Night Club combines elements of American soul, chopped and screwed music, glam rock, 1950s rock and roll, garage rock, new wave and Captured Tracks' signature jangle guitar pop sound. Pitchforks Evan Minsker opined that, lyrically, "it's probably safe to assume that at least 80% of Night Club is laced with a meta joke that nobody's in on except DeMarco," and No Ripcord described his performance on the record as resembling a "hopelessly romantic swinger." DeMarco himself said Rock And Roll Night Club was a joke as well, saying that he was being "intentionally sketchy" in making what Elliot Sharp of the official site for Red Bull described as "over-the-top", "conceptual", "kooky",  and overall "a trashy, sleazy rock album that celebrated rock's trashy, sleazy core."

DeMarco's vocals on the first rough half of Rock and Roll Night Club were analyzed to be an impersonation of Elvis Presley. The first two songs, which No Ripcord compared to Charlie Feathers, "are both written in the point of view of a heartthrob whose eyes are dead set on his girl, whether he wants to play games with her, have an intimate night, or even make mental annotations on her country girl style." The Peter Sagar co-written "Baby's Wearing Blue Jeans" was called by Allmusic's Fred Thomas a "weird denim-fetish anthem", containing clean guitars and muffled drums in its instrumentation. The exact same vocal melody and soft singing is later brought into "One More Tear to Cry", which Thomas analogized as a Lou Reed song produced by Ariel Pink, and then  "European Vegas", a song in which DeMarco "pleas his baby to stay one more night while a jangly chord chimes in with a dash of sorrow," according to No Ripcord. "Vegas" likewise reflects "One More Tear"'s use of slight variations of the same melody as the previous tracks. Thomas opined that "instead of being an annoyingly repetitive conceptual misfire, the identical melodies work in DeMarco's homespun glam thug sonnets in an if-it-ain't-broke kinda way, lending different shades of the same color to their respective songs." However, a new melody is introduced on "She's Really All I Need", a track which was lyrically compared by Loud and Quiet to Pavement. and instrumentally containing wobbly guitar riffs and "beachy" percussion, as well as the absence of DeMarco's distorted vocals.

Some say "Moving Like Mike" is about Brooklyn Based Video Editor "Doc" Mike Kutsch, but it is most likely an out-of-key "dork-fest ode" to Michael Jackson that restores the overall vibe of the LP, after the "She's Really All I Need"-induced departure. The album's standard track list is closed with the Lou Reed-style funk song "I'm a Man", Initially titled "Eyeballs", DeMarco said he was trying to write about a man's lifestyle in Montreal with the song. The bonus track "Only You", lifted from the Makeout Videotape album Ying Yang was described by Thomas as near towards a modern take on indie rock, and sounding like a worn-out cassette demo recorded by the band Deerhunter around the time of their third studio album Microcastle. The song forms a Duane Eddy-esque twangy guitar line into a "garage stomp" by the time its "dark, seductive chorus" comes in. Minsker describes the two bonus tracks, "Only You" and "Me & Mine", as the "biggest surprise" of the album, comparing the two tracks to Real Estate and emphasizing the contrast of these two songs with the rest of the album. However, Minsker later resolved that there is a relatively small difference between the "goofy creep" who sings about "the boogie woogie woman lookin' my way" and the "straightforward crooner" who sings "I'm done crying over her."

Recording 
All of the tracks were recorded on a TASCAM 244 Portastudio 4 track cassette recorder except for one track, which was recorded on a Fostex VF-80. The recording took place in a Montreal apartment that Demarco and his girlfriend shared. The vocals and drums were all recorded with a Shure Beta 58A. The guitars and bass were all Direct input into the 244. The recording made extensive use of the 244's pitch control, Demarco described this to Tapeop Magazine: "I was trying to make a Ramones record... I thought, 'I'm going to do basic power chord riffs, I'm going to do solos, and I'm going to do it really fast.' It turned out I'm awful at it. When I slowed things down it was like, 'Ah, now I've got something'". Demarco also used a method of track summing to record more than the 4 track limit: "I learned to ping-pong the 4-track too, so I would do three tracks, bounce it to one, do another three, and hopefully the song would be done by then". Bouncing the tracks degraded the signal resulting in generation loss. This contributed to the sludgy lo-fi sound of the record and was partly inspired by the techniques of Joe Meek's I Hear a New World. Mixing was a challenge due to the limitations of the 244. For the guitars Demarco often turned the parametric equalizer up all the way and adjusted the gain to remove the bass and provide a space for them in the mix. Extreme panning was also used to separate the channels. An Alesis MicroVerb 4 was used for effects on guitars and vocals.

Critical reception 

At Metacritic, which assigns a weighted mean rating out of 100 to reviews from mainstream critics, the album received an average score of 79 based on 5 reviews, which indicates "generally favorable reviews". Fred Thomas of AllMusic opined: "Rock and Roll Night Club is a confusing record, but not a mess. On the contrary, it's so deeply calculated that the intentions and possible motivations of its songs are likely to be lost on most. This would be a problem if the good songs weren't so incredible and strange and the weak ones so immediately forgettable."

Track listing

Personnel 
Adapted from the liner notes. 
 Mac DeMarco – vocals, guitar, bass guitar, drums, percussion, keyboards, composer
 Maddy Glowicki – background vocals on "European Vegas"
 Josh Bonati – mastering
 Ryan McCardie – cover design, layout
 Evan Prosofsky – cover photography
 Peter Sagar – co-writing on "Baby's Wearing Blue Jeans"

Release history

References

External links
 

2012 EPs
Mac DeMarco albums
Captured Tracks albums